The Faculty of Theology and Islamic Studies is one of the faculties of University of Tehran, which was established in 1935.

History
The Faculty of Theology and Islamic Studies of University of Tehran was established in 1935 at the Sepahsalar College building presently known as Shahid Motahari University, under the name of Faculty of Theoretical and Traditional Studies with three disciplines of Arabic literature, Theoretical studies and Traditional studies. This period lasted for five years and in 1940 the faculty was closed. The activity of the faculty was resumed in 1943 at the campus of the Iranian Academy with two disciplines of Theoretical studies and Traditional studies and it was gradually developed and two other disciplines named Arabic language and literature and Islamic culture were added to it. Also, PhD programs were offered in two fields of Theoretical studies and Traditional studies. In 1965, the faculty's name Faculty of Theoretical and Traditional Studies was changed to the Faculty of Theology and Islamic Studies. In 1978, the faculty was moved to the current building. At present, the faculty has 8 Department of study with more than 24 undergraduate, graduate and doctoral programs with over 120 faculty members.
The faculty of theology and Islamic studies is one of the world’s top academic institutions focusing on Islamic and comparative religious studies from Islamic history, mysticism and philosophy to Quranic sciences, Hadith and Shia jurisprudence, as well as work ethics.

Educational groups
The Faculty of Theology and Islamic Studies of University of Tehran has eight educational groups consists of six departments and two centers which offers fields and degrees as below:

 Faculty of Theology and Islamic Studies
 Departments
 Religious Studies Department
 Programs
 Theology and Islamic Studies
 Religion and Mysticism
 Degrees
 Bachelor
 Master
 PhD
 Islamic History and Muslim civilization Department
 Programs
 Theology and Islamic Studies
 The History of Civilization of Islamic Nations
 Degrees
 Bachelor
 Master
 PhD
 Qur'an and Hadith Studies Department
 Programs
 Theology and Islamic Studies
 Quranic Sciences and Hadith
 Degrees
 Bachelor
 Master
 PhD
 Islamic Law Department
 Programs
 Theology and Islamic Studies
 Jurisprudence and the Foundation of Islamic Law
 Degrees
 Bachelor
 Master
 PhD
 Shaafei Law Department
 Programs
 Shaafei Jurisprudence
 Degrees
 Bachelor
 Master
 PhD
 Islamic Philosophy and Theology (KALAM) Department
 Programs
 Theology and Islamic Studies
 Philosophy and Islamic Kalam
 Degrees
 Bachelor
 Master
 PhD
 Centers
 Center for Philosophy of Religion
 Programs
 Philosophy of Religion
 Degrees
 Master
 Center for the History of Science
 Programs
 History of Science
 Orientations
 Mathematics in the Islamic World
 Astronomy in the Islamic World
 Physics in the Islamic World
 Pharmacy in the Islamic World
 Degrees
 Master

Organizational structure
The Faculty of Theology and Islamic Studies organizational structure consists of the Presidency and the main five Deputies as below:

 Faculty of Theology and Islamic Studies
 Presidency
 The highest position of the faculty who holds the office for four years
 Office of the President
 Public Relations Affairs
 Deputies
 Education and Postgraduate Studies Deputy
 Deputy Office
 Office of Educational Services and Graduate Studies
 E-learning Office
 Educational Groups and Departments
 Religious Studies
 Islamic History and Muslim civilization
 Qur'an and Hadith Studies
 Islamic Law
 Shaafei Law
 Islamic Philosophy and Theology (KALAM)
 Philosophy of Religion
 History of Science
 Research Deputy
 Deputy Office
 Experts
 Library
 Website and ICT
 Publication
 Student and Cultural Deputy
 Deputy Office
 Experts
 Martyrs and Sacrificers Students Affairs
 Advisory Office
 Administrative and Financial Deputy
 Deputy Office
 Accounting
 Administrative Affairs and Support
 Secretariat
 International Deputy
 International Relations Affairs
 International Students Affairs

Eminent alumni
Some of eminent scholars who are graduated from the Faculty of Theology and Islamic Studies of University of Tehran:

Library
The library of the Faculty of Theology and Islamic Studies is one of the rich libraries in fields of Islamic studies in the world and has more than 130,000 volumes of books in Persian, Arabic and Latin languages.

 Faculty of Theology and Islamic Studies
 The Library
 Books
 Persian Language
 42115 Volumes
 English Language
 1067 Volumes
 Arabic Language
 54518 Volumes
 Other Languages
 386 Volumes
 Journals
 Persian Language
 270 Titles
 English Language
 56 Titles
 Other Languages
 88 Titles

See also
 College of Science, University of Tehran
 Faculty of Letters and Humanities of the University of Tehran
 Tehran School of Political Science
 Institute of Biochemistry and Biophysics

References

External links
 Picture: Faculty of Theology and Islamic Studies of the University of Tehran
 Faculty of Theology and Islamic Studies on ACADEMIA
 FACULTIES OF THE UNIVERSITY OF TEHRAN - Encyclopedia Iranica
 Admissions: University of Tehran
 Colleges: University of Tehran

University of Tehran
1935 establishments
Educational institutions established in 1935
1935 establishments in Iran
University of Tehran faculties
Faculty of Theology and Islamic Studies of the University of Tehran